The Professionals are an English punk rock band active from 1979 to early 1982 and again from 2015. They were formed by ex-Sex Pistols members Steve Jones and Paul Cook after that band's demise.

Career
The Professionals were formed in 1979 by guitarist Steve Jones and drummer Paul Cook, both formerly of the Sex Pistols. In the previous year, Johnny Rotten had left the Sex Pistols, and both Cook and Jones had sung lead for the late Sex Pistols recordings "Silly Thing" and "Lonely Boy". For these recordings, Lightning Raiders bassist Andy Allan was employed as a session musician. After the Sex Pistols officially split and broke ties with manager Malcolm McLaren, this line-up was resurrected as the Professionals, and signed to Virgin Records, the same  label as the Sex Pistols.

In July 1980, the Professionals released their first single, "Just Another Dream", which also included a video promo. This was followed by a second single "1-2-3" in October, which reached No. 43 in the UK Singles Charts. Shortly after the second single's release, Cook and Jones had plans to debut a self-titled LP during that same year. But there were some legal problems, as Allan had no recording contract with Virgin. He sued the record company, claiming he had never been credited nor paid by them. Consequently, Virgin's compilation album Cash Cows, which featured the Professionals' track "Kick Down the Doors", was withdrawn and the album was shelved. After Allan left the band, he was replaced by ex-Subway Sect bassist Paul Myers, with Ray McVeigh also joining the band as a second guitarist. The new line-up of the Professionals later re-recorded previous material so that Allan would not be owed any further royalties.

The Professionals were first managed by Dave Hill, who had managed Johnny Thunders and was managing the Pretenders. They recorded radio sessions for John Peel's Radio 1, which aired on 10 November 1980, to promote the release of "Join the Professionals" that same month. Due to difficulties in finding a producer (Mick Glossop was eventually picked), the release of the single was repeatedly delayed up to June 1981. Hill left afterwards to focus on the Pretenders, and John Curd was chosen as a replacement. They then recorded further sessions with BBC, this time for The Evening Show with Mike Read on 15 December.

The group brought in producer Nigel Gray to help record their full-length album; the result was I Didn't See It Coming, released in November 1981. The album was supported by UK and U.S. tour dates, and the release of a single for the song "The Magnificent". But the band's American tour was cut short when Cook, Myers, and McVeigh were injured in a car accident. The Professionals returned to America in the spring of 1982 after a hiatus for recovery, but Jones' and Myers' drug problems further hampered the band's prospects. 

Later that year, "Join the Professionals" was featured in the movie Ladies and Gentlemen, The Fabulous Stains along with three other Cook/Jones compositions, "Conned Again", "La La La", and "Don't Blow It All the Way".

2015 reunion
In celebration of the release of a three-disc set (The Complete Professionals) by Universal Music Group on 16 October 2015, the Professionals, with Tom Spencer filling in for Steve Jones, reunited for a concert at the 100 Club. This reunion also included a warm-up gig at the Fleece in Bristol three days prior to the main show.

The band returned to the capital in June 2016 for a co-headline performance with the Rich Kids at the Islington Academy.

New lineup, album and touring
In March 2017 the band announced via their official Facebook page that the lineup of founding member Paul Cook along with Paul Myers and Tom Spencer would be releasing the first new music under the Professionals name in 35 years.  Although Steve Jones isn't officially listed as a member of this new incarnation of the group, the band confirmed it is with his full blessing and that he is featured on the album alongside other guests including Marco Pirroni and Billy Duffy.

2018 saw some UK live appearances of the band, like the Rebellion and Isle of Wight Festivals. Chris McCormack (3 Colours Red) took on guitar duties. Also during this year, original bass player Paul Myers had to step aside for health reasons. Toshi JC Ogawa, the band's tech guy, stepped in as bass player. They supported Billy Idol on his English dates.

Legacy
A best-of album was eventually released in 2005, containing material from their one album, four singles, and the album's-worth of demos recorded with Andy Allan. Ten years later, the compilation was expanded further with the release of The Complete Professionals, which features all of their studio tracks, alternate recordings, and radio sessions.

Their song "Join the Professionals" was covered by the Epoxies.

Discography

Studio albums
1980 – The Professionals (Virgin Records) (unreleased because of a legal dispute with bassist Andy Allan over unpaid royalties, released in 1990 by Limited Edition Records, in 1997 and 2001 by Virgin Records)
1981 – I Didn't See It Coming (Virgin Records, November 1981) (re-released on CD with bonus tracks by EMI, June 2001)
2017 - What in the World (Automaton Records, October 2017)
2021 - SNAFU

Live album
2020 - Live In London (JTP Records, March 2020) (recorded live at Highbury Garage in London, October 2017)

Singles
1980 – "Just Another Dream" b/w "Action Man" (Virgin Records, July 1980)
1980 – "1-2-3" b/w "Baby, I Don't Care" and "White Light/White Heat" (Virgin Records, October 1980) - UK No. 43
1981 – "Join the Professionals" b/w "Has Anybody Got an Alibi" (Virgin Records, June 1981)
1981 – "The Magnificent" b/w "Just Another Dream" (Virgin Records, October 1981).

EPs
2020 - "Kingdom Come"/"Reality"/"1, 2, 3 (TV Session)"/"Rewind (TV Session)" (JTP Records, January 2020)
2020 - "Curl Up And Cry"/"Fade Away"/"Going, Going, Gone (TV Session)"/"Kick Down The Doors (TV Session)" (JTP Records, February 2020)  
2020 - "Twenty 20 Vision"/"One That Got Away"/"Join The Professionals (Live)"/"Good Man Down (TV Session)" (JTP Records, March 2020)

Compilations
1980 – "Kick Down the Doors" featured on the compilation Cash Cows (Virgin Records, October 1980) (Later releases omitted the song after Andy Allan's lawsuit against Virgin.)
1981 – "Little Boys in Blue" featured on the Sounds Freebie No. 2 split single promo (Sounds magazine, October 1981) (b/w "I’ll Rip Your Spine Out" by Gillan)
1981 - "1-2-3" featured on the compilation Suburban Music (Virgin Records, 1981)
1993 - "1-2-3" and "Join The Professionals" featured on the compilation After The Anarchy (Conoisseur Collection, 1993)
2001 - "1-2-3" featured on the compilation Cash From Chaos (EMI, 2001)
2002 -	"Baby I Don't Care" featured on the compilation All Covered In Punk (EMI, March 2002)
2002 - "Join The Professionals" featured on the compilation 24 Carat Punk (EMI, 2002)
2005 – The Best of The Professionals (Captain Oi!, October 2005)
2013 - "Baby I Don't Care" featured on the compilation Massive Hits! Punk Rock (EMI, 2013)
2013 - "1-2-3" featured on the compilation New Gold Dreams - Post Punk & New Romantic '79 - '83 (Virgin Records, 2013)
2015 – The Complete Professionals (Universal Music Group, October 2015)
2016 - "Baby I Don't Care" featured on the compilation Massive Hits! Punk Rock (EMI, 2016)
2016 - "Baby I Don't Care" featured on the compilation Punk Hits (Universal Music Group, 2016)
2016 – "Just Another Dream" featured on the compilation Classic Punk (Spectrum Music, 2016)
2017 - "Crescendo" featured on the compilation Punk. 40 Years Of Subversive Culture (Spectrum Music, 2017)
2017 - "Good Man Down" featured on the compilation Classic Rock Compilation 65 (Classic Rock, October 2017)
2018 - "Just Another Dream"and "1-2-3" featured on the compilation Punk & New Wave - The Ultimate Collection (Universal Music Group, March 2018)

Personnel
Current
Paul Cook − drums, backing vocals (1979–1982, 2015–present)
Tom Spencer − guitar, vocals (2015–present)
 Chris McCormack - guitar, backing vocals (2017–present)
 Toshi JC Ogawa − bass, backing vocals (2018–present)
Former
Steve Jones − lead guitar, vocals (1979–1982)
Andy Allan − bass, backing vocals (1979–1980)
Paul Myers - bass guitar, backing vocals (1980–1982, 2015–2018)
Ray McVeigh − rhythm guitar, backing vocals (1980–1982, 2015–2016)

See also
List of British punk bands
List of Peel sessions
Timeline of punk rock

References

External links
The Professionals' Official website
Kick Down the Doors - Cook 'n' Jones website

English punk rock groups
Musical groups established in 1979
Sex Pistols
Musical groups disestablished in 1982
Musical groups reestablished in 2015